The following lists events in 1908 in Iceland.

Incumbents
 Monarch: Frederick VIII
Prime Minister – Hannes Hafstein

Events
21 April – Knattspyrnufélagið Víkingur is established.
1 May – Knattspyrnufélagið Fram is established.
10 September –
The 1908 Icelandic parliamentary election
At the 1908 Icelandic prohibition referendum, a ban on importing alcohol is approved by 60.1% of voters.

Births

30 April – Bjarni Benediktsson, politician (d. 1970).
13 October – Steinn Steinarr, poet (d. 1958)

References

 
Iceland
Iceland
Years of the 20th century in Iceland